Constantinople: City of the World's Desire 1453-1924 is a 1995 non-fiction book by Philip Mansel, covering Ottoman Constantinople (now Istanbul) during the rule of the Ottoman Empire.

The author hoped to show positive aspects of the Ottoman Empire while acknowledging some negative aspects.

William Dalrymple of The Independent stated that it is an important work due to few people being able to comprehend Ottoman Turkish and therefore being able to research the Ottoman Empire.

Background
William Armstrong of Hürriyet Daily News stated that the usage of "Constantinople" instead of "Istanbul" was a "deliberate decision" to highlight the "historical cosmopolitanism" that ended after the end of the empire.

Contents
Mordecai Lee of the University of Wisconsin-Milwaukee states that the book "maintains a strict academic-level presentation" although it is "eminently readable for a lay person". The author discusses the various aspects of the city, among them religious tolerance and tensions. Armstrong states that the book does not flesh out "historical blackground" and therefore does not demonstrate "deep impression of the underlying intellectual undercurrents".

The book's bibliography and end notes sections make up 22 and 41 pages each.

Reception
John Ash of The Washington Post stated that Mansel wrote an "engaging and richly detailed account".

Lee stated that stated that the "more positive aspects of Ottoman history[...]are especially enlightening to the reader". Lee praised how the "information flows naturally" and concluded that it was an "outstanding book".

Dalrymple described it as "an impeccably researched masterpiece of exquisite historical writing, without question one of the finest books ever written by an Englishman on the Turks."

References
  - 16 March 2010 is the date of first publication

Notes

External links
 Constantinople at Phillip Mansel's official website
 Chapter 1 - Posted at The Washington Post

Books about the Ottoman Empire
History of Istanbul
1995 non-fiction books
20th-century history books